Duke of Kent and Strathearn is a title that was created once in the Peerage of Great Britain.

History
Several Earls of Kent had previously been created in the Peerage of England. Henry Grey, 12th Earl of Kent was created Duke of Kent in 1710, but the title became extinct upon his death in 1740.

On 23 April 1799, the double dukedom of Kent and Strathearn was given, along with the Earldom of Dublin, to King George III's fourth son, Prince Edward Augustus. After the Union of Great Britain, the Hanoverian kings liked to grant double titles (one from one constituent country, one from another) to emphasise unity.

Edward had only one legitimate child, a daughter, Princess Alexandrina Victoria (the future Queen Victoria). Upon Edward's death in 1820, the dukedom of Kent and Strathearn became extinct, as he had no legitimate male heir.

| Prince EdwardHouse of Hanover1799–1820also: Earl of Dublin (1799)
| 
| 2 November 1767Londonson of King George III and Queen Charlotte
| Princess Victoria of Saxe-Coburg-Saalfeld18181 child
| 23 January 1820Sidmouthaged 52

|}
Prince Edward had no legitimate sons and all his titles became extinct on his death.

See also
British monarchy
Kent
Dukes of Kent
Earls of Kent
Kingdom of Kent

Notes and references

 
Extinct dukedoms in the Peerage of Great Britain
1799 establishments in Great Britain
Noble titles created in 1799